Monster Rancher 3 (known in Japan as ) is the third game in Tecmo's Monster Rancher series. It is the first game in the series for the PlayStation 2.

Gameplay
This game uses cel-shaded graphics to give the game a more cartoon-like feel. However, the player may still generate monsters by inserting a disc into the PS2. Furthermore, Monster Rancher 3 is the first game in the series to allow players the ability to generate monsters based on past discs, as well as monsters already bred. As an example, once a monster has been bred, from that point on one can simply generate them from their Monster Encyclopedia, saving the gamer unnecessary time and trouble having to remember and find discs that generated various monsters. Also, Monster Rancher 3 is the first and currently only Monster Rancher game to allow players to trade monster data. By inserting memory cards for both players, it is possible to transfer monsters in one player's Monster Encyclopedia to another player's file.

Reception

The game received "generally favorable reviews", albeit less than the previous two games in the series, according to the review aggregation website Metacritic. Eric Bratcher of Next Generation called it "A unique, absorbing game that needs to expand its vision in order to live up to its revolutionary roots." In Japan, Famitsu gave it a score of 29 out of 40.

References

External links
 

2001 video games
Life simulation games
Monster Rancher
Music generated games
PlayStation 2 games
PlayStation 2-only games
Role-playing video games
Video games developed in Japan